There are 274 listed buildings in the Borough of Barrow-in-Furness, with about 70% in Barrow-in-Furness itself. The 2015 Heritage Index formed by the Royal Society of Arts and the Heritage Lottery Fund placed the Borough as seventh highest of 325 English districts with an especially high score relating to industrial heritage assets. The Barrow Island  conservation area contains dozens of historic shipyard buildings and tenements, while numerous listed buildings can be found lining Abbey Road and Duke Street, which were designed as the principal north to south and east to west thoroughfares of the Victorian planned town. Despite many buildings and structures dating from this era, an abundance of listed buildings exist throughout the Borough that pre-date Barrow, in villages that were consumed by the rapidly expanding town. One notable example being Newbarns village which retains its original 18th century street layout. Significant clusters of listed buildings can be found around the ruins of the 12th-century Furness Abbey and Market Street, the Medieval centre of Dalton-in-Furness. The oldest listed building in Barrow is Furness Abbey, dated 1127 and the newest is the John Whinnerah Institute, completed in 1934.

Within other heritage categories the only asset recognised by Historic England in the Borough is Barrow Park which is designated as Grade II on the Register of Historic Parks and Gardens.

Grade I Listed buildings
Barrow-in-Furness has 8 Grade I listed buildings, representing a higher proportion of all listed buildings than national average. They are listed below.

Grade II* Listed buildings
Barrow-in-Furness has 15 Grade II* listed buildings. They are listed below.

Grade II Listed buildings
Barrow-in-Furness has 250 Grade II listed buildings. They are listed below.

Demolished Listed Buildings
The following Grade II listed buildings have been demolished in Barrow. The list excludes buildings that were de-listed and subsequently demolished (e.g. 51 Forshaw Street and Queen's Hotel).

References

External links
 English Heritage Listed Buildings Search

Barrow-in-Furness
Listed buildings